The Nigerian National Assembly delegation from Bayelsa comprises three Senators representing Bayelsa Central, Bayelsa East, and Bayelsa West, and five Representatives representing Sagbama/ekeremor, Ogbia, Southern Ijaw, Bayelsa Central, and Brass/Nembe.

Fourth Republic

4th Assembly (1999–2003)

6th Assembly (2007–2011)

9th Assembly (2019–2023)

References
 Official Website - National Assembly House of Representatives (Bayelsa State)
 Senator List

Politics of Bayelsa State
National Assembly (Nigeria) delegations by state